American Dreams in China is a 2013 Chinese comedy drama film co-produced and directed by Peter Chan and starring Huang Xiaoming, Deng Chao, and Tong Dawei. It was shown at the 2013 Toronto International Film Festival. It is based on the story of New Oriental.

Plot
Three young Chinese men from poor backgrounds achieve success by establishing a reputable English teaching school. The film begins in 1985, during China's national study-abroad craze, a time when undergraduates became infatuated with America and believed that studying abroad was their only hope for a prosperous future. 

Cheng Dongqing (Huang Xiaoming), Wang Yang (Tong Dawei), and Meng Xiaojun (Deng Chao) are three friends studying at Beijing's prestigious Yenching Academy. and simultaneously prepping for American visa interviews. Wang is the first to be granted one but forfeits it to stay with his Western girlfriend, while Cheng is repeatedly denied one. Only Meng actually gets a study visa, and as he's leaving, he tells his friends he has no intention of returning to China.

Cast
 Huang Xiaoming as Cheng Dongqing
 Deng Chao as Meng Xiaojun
 Tong Dawei as Wang Yang
 Du Juan as Su Mei

Awards and nominations

References

External links

2013 films
Chinese comedy-drama films
Films directed by Peter Chan
2010s Mandarin-language films
Films set in Beijing
Films set in New York City
Films set in the 1980s
Films set in the 1990s
Films set in the 2000s
Films shot in New York City
Films shot in Beijing
Films shot in Tianjin
Films based on actual events
New Oriental
2013 comedy-drama films